Dockside ferry wharf is located on the southern side of the Brisbane River serving the Brisbane suburb of Kangaroo Point in Queensland, Australia. It was served by Transdev Brisbane Ferries' CityHopper services. These services were suspended in July 2020 and formally cancelled to stop at this wharf in October 2020.

History 
The wharf sustained minor damage during the January 2011 Brisbane floods. It reopened after repairs on 14 February 2011.

References

External links

Ferry wharves in Brisbane
Kangaroo Point, Queensland